Yukhari-Stal is a rural locality (a selo) in Suleyman-Stalsky District, Republic of Dagestan, Russia. The population was 1,109 as of 2010. There are 3 streets.

Geography 
Yukhari-Stal is located 5 km north of Kasumkent (the district's administrative centre) by road. Orta-Stal is the nearest rural locality.

References 

Rural localities in Suleyman-Stalsky District